Farrah Leni Fawcett (born Ferrah Leni Fawcett; February 2, 1947 – June 25, 2009) was an American actress. A four-time Primetime Emmy Award nominee and six-time Golden Globe Award nominee, Fawcett rose to international fame when she played a starring role in the first season of the television series Charlie's Angels.

Fawcett began her career in the 1960s appearing in commercials and guest roles on television. During the 1970s, she appeared in numerous television series, including recurring roles on Harry O (1974–1976), and The Six Million Dollar Man (1974–1978) with her then-husband, film and television star Lee Majors. Her iconic red swimsuit poster sold six million copies in its first year in print. Fawcett's breakthrough role was the role of private investigator Jill Munroe in Charlie's Angels, which co-starred Kate Jackson and Jaclyn Smith. The show propelled all three actresses to stardom. After appearing in the show's first season in 1976, Fawcett decided to leave Charlie's Angels. She later returned as a guest star in six episodes during the show's third and fourth seasons (1978–1980). For her work in Charlie's Angels, Fawcett received her first Golden Globe nomination.

In 1983, Fawcett received positive reviews for her performance in the Off-Broadway play Extremities. She was subsequently cast in the 1986 film version and received a Golden Globe nomination. She received Emmy Award nominations for her role as a battered wife in The Burning Bed (1984) and for her portrayal of real-life murderer Diane Downs in Small Sacrifices (1989). Her 1980s work in TV movies earned her four additional Golden Globe nominations. Although Fawcett weathered some negative press for a rambling appearance on The Late Show with David Letterman in 1997, she garnered strong reviews that year for her role in the film The Apostle with Robert Duvall. In the 21st century, she continued acting on television, holding recurring roles on the sitcom Spin City (2001) and the drama The Guardian (2002–2003). For the latter, she received her third Emmy nomination. Fawcett's film credits include Love Is a Funny Thing (1969), Myra Breckinridge (1970), Logan's Run (1976), Sunburn (1979), Saturn 3 (1980), The Cannonball Run (1981), Extremities (1986), The Apostle (1997), and Dr. T & the Women (2000).

Fawcett was diagnosed with anal cancer in 2006 and died three years later at age 62. The 2009 NBC documentary Farrah's Story chronicled her battle with the disease. She posthumously earned her fourth Emmy nomination for her work as a producer on Farrah's Story.

Early life
Fawcett was born on February 2, 1947, in Corpus Christi, Texas, and was the younger of two daughters. Her mother, Pauline Alice Fawcett (née Evans; 1914–2005), was a homemaker and her father, James William Fawcett (1917–2010), was an oil field contractor. Her older sister, Diane Fawcett Walls (1938–2001), was a graphic artist. She was of Irish, French, English and Choctaw Native American ancestry. Fawcett once said the name "Farrah" was "made up" by her mother, because it went well with their last name.

A Roman Catholic, Fawcett began her early education at the parish school of the church her family attended, St. Patrick's Roman Catholic Church in Corpus Christi. She graduated from W. B. Ray High School in Corpus Christi, where she was voted "most beautiful" by her classmates in her freshman, sophomore, junior, and senior years of high school. Between 1965 and 1968, she attended the University of Texas, where she studied microbiology before switching her major to art. She lived at the Mayfair House on Pearl Street, west of the campus, and was a member of Delta Delta Delta sorority.

In her freshman year of college, she was named one of the "ten most beautiful coeds on campus", and it was the first time that a freshman had been chosen for the honor. Her photos were sent to various agencies in Hollywood. David Mirisch, a Hollywood agent, called her and urged her to come to Los Angeles. She turned him down, but he continued for the next two years. Finally, in the summer of 1968, Fawcett moved to Los Angeles, initially staying at the Hollywood Studio Club, with her parents' permission to "try her luck" in the entertainment industry.

Career

Early career

When Fawcett arrived in Hollywood at age 21 in 1968, Screen Gems signed her to a $350-a-week contract. She began to appear in commercials for such products as Ultra Brite toothpaste, Noxzema skin cream, Max Factor cosmetics, Mercury Cougar automobiles, and Beautyrest mattresses, among others. Her earliest acting appearances were guest spots on The Flying Nun (1969) and I Dream of Jeannie (1969–70). She made numerous other television appearances, including Getting Together, Owen Marshall: Counselor at Law, Mayberry R.F.D., and The Partridge Family. She appeared in four episodes of The Six Million Dollar Man with husband Lee Majors, on The Dating Game and S.W.A.T, and had a recurring role on Harry O alongside David Janssen as the title character's girlfriend, Sue. She had a sizable part in the 1969 French romantic-drama Love Is a Funny Thing. She played the role of Mary Ann Pringle in Myra Breckinridge (1970).

Rise to stardom 
In 1976, Pro Arts Inc. pitched the idea of a poster of Fawcett to her agent. A photo shoot was then arranged with photographer Bruce McBroom, who was hired by the poster company. According to friend Nels Van Patten, Fawcett styled her own hair and did her makeup without the aid of a mirror. Her blonde highlights were further heightened by a squeeze of lemon juice. Fawcett selected her six favorite pictures from 40 rolls of film, and the choice was eventually narrowed to the one that made her famous. The resulting image of Fawcett in a one-piece red bathing suit is the best-selling poster in history.

Fawcett earned a supporting role in Michael Anderson's science-fiction film Logan's Run (1976) with Michael York. She and her husband, television star Lee Majors, were frequent tennis partners with producer Aaron Spelling. Spelling and his business partner eventually chose Fawcett to play Jill Munroe in their upcoming made-for-TV movie, Charlie's Angels, a movie of the week which aired on March 21, 1976, on ABC. The movie starred Fawcett (then billed as Farrah Fawcett-Majors), Kate Jackson, and Jaclyn Smith as private investigators for Townsend Associates, a detective agency run by a reclusive multimillionaire whom the women had never met. Voiced by John Forsythe, the Charles Townsend character presented cases and dispensed advice via a speakerphone to his core team of three female employees, whom he referred to as "Angels". They were aided in the office and occasionally in the field by two male associates, played by character actors David Doyle and David Ogden Stiers. The program quickly earned a huge following, leading the network to air it a second time and approve production for a series, with the pilot's principal cast minus Ogden Stiers.

The Charlie's Angels series proper formally debuted on September 22, 1976. Each of the three actresses was propelled to stardom, but Fawcett dominated popularity polls. She subsequently won a People's Choice Award for Favorite Performer in a New TV Program. In a 1977 interview with TV Guide, she said, "When the show was number three, I thought it was our acting. When we got to be number one, I decided it could only be because none of us wears a bra." Fawcett's appearance in the television show boosted sales of her poster, and she earned far more in royalties from poster sales than from her salary for appearing in Charlie's Angels. Her hairstyle went on to become an international trend, with women sporting a "Farrah-do", a "Farrah-flip", or simply "Farrah hair". Iterations of her hair style predominated among American women's hairstyles well into the 1980s.

In the spring of 1977, Fawcett left Charlie's Angels after only one season. After a series of legal battles over her contract with ABC, Cheryl Ladd replaced her on the show, portraying Jill Munroe's younger sister Kris Munroe. Over the years, numerous explanations were offered for Fawcett's precipitous withdrawal from the show. Because her husband, Lee Majors, was the star of an established television show as well (ABC's Six Million Dollar Man, which aired from 1974 to 1978), the strain on her marriage due to filming schedules that kept them apart for long periods was frequently cited, but her ambition to broaden her acting abilities in films has also been given as an explanation. She never officially signed her series contract with Spelling, owing to protracted negotiations over royalties from her image's use in peripheral products, which led to an even more protracted lawsuit filed by Spelling and his company when she left the show. As a result of leaving her contract four years early, she reluctantly signed a new contract with ABC, stating that she would make six guest appearances on the series over a two-year period (1978–1980).

Charlie's Angels was a global success, maintaining its appeal in syndication and spawning, particularly in the show's first three seasons, a cottage industry of peripheral products, including several series of bubble gum cards, two sets of fashion dolls, numerous posters, puzzles, and school supplies, novelizations of episodes, toy vans, and a board game, all featuring Fawcett's likeness. The "Angels" also appeared on the covers of magazines around the world, from countless fan magazines to TV Guide (four times) to Time.

In 2004, the television film Behind the Camera: The Unauthorized Story of Charlie's Angels dramatized the events from the show, with supermodel and actress Tricia Helfer portraying Fawcett and Ben Browder portraying Lee Majors, Fawcett's then-husband.

Post-Angels film roles
In 1978, Fawcett's first post-Angels movie, Somebody Killed Her Husband, was released to adverse reviews (some critics referred to the film as Somebody Killed Her Career) and a poor box-office. The 1979 release of Sunburn, co-starring Charles Grodin and Art Carney, was met by equally unfavorable reviews. In 1980, Fawcett starred with Kirk Douglas in Stanley Donen's science-fiction film Saturn 3; the film earned unfavorable reviews from critics and experienced poor box office sales. The following year she starred alongside an ensemble cast, which included Burt Reynolds, Dean Martin, and Sammy Davis Jr. in the comedy The Cannonball Run (1981). Later that year, she co-starred with Katharine Ross, Sam Elliott, and Andy Griffith in the television movie Murder in Texas.

In 1983, Fawcett won critical acclaim for her role in the Off-Broadway stage production of the controversial play Extremities, written by William Mastrosimone. Replacing Susan Sarandon, she played the role of an attempted rape victim who turns the tables on her attacker. She described the role as "the most grueling, the most intense, the most physically demanding and emotionally exhausting" of her career. During one performance, a stalker in the audience disrupted the show by asking Fawcett if she had received the photos and letters he had mailed her. Police removed the man and were able to issue him a summons only for disorderly conduct.

The following year, her role as battered wife Francine Hughes in the fact-based television movie The Burning Bed (1984) earned her the first of her four Emmy Award nominations. The project was the first television movie to provide a nationwide 800 number that offered help for others in the situation, in this case victims of domestic abuse. It was the highest-rated television movie of the season.

In 1986, Fawcett appeared in the movie version of Extremities, which performed well financially. For her performance she received a Golden Globe nomination for Best Performance by an Actress in a Motion Picture – Drama. She appeared in Jon Avnet's Between Two Women with Colleen Dewhurst, and took several more dramatic roles as either infamous or renowned women. She was nominated for Golden Globe awards for roles as Beate Klarsfeld in Nazi Hunter: The Beate Klarsfeld Story and troubled Woolworth heiress Barbara Hutton in Poor Little Rich Girl: The Barbara Hutton Story, and won a CableACE Award for her 1989 portrayal of groundbreaking LIFE magazine photojournalist Margaret Bourke-White in Double Exposure: The Story of Margaret Bourke-White.

Her 1989 portrayal of convicted murderer Diane Downs in the miniseries Small Sacrifices earned her a second Emmy nomination and her sixth Golden Globe Award nomination. The miniseries won a Peabody Award for excellence in television, with Fawcett's performance singled out by the organization, which stated "Ms. Fawcett brings a sense of realism rarely seen in television miniseries (to) a drama of unusual power".

Later career
Throughout the 1970s and 1980s, Fawcett had steadfastly resisted signing a release for nude photographs of her to be published in magazines, even though she had briefly appeared topless in the 1980 film Saturn 3. She caused a major stir by posing semi-nude in the December 1995 issue of Playboy. At the age of 50, she appeared in a pictorial for the July 1997 issue of Playboy, which also became a top seller. The issue and its accompanying video featured Fawcett actually using her own body to paint on canvas; for years, this had been one of her ambitions.

On June 5, 1997, Fawcett received negative commentary after she gave a rambling interview and appeared distracted on Late Show with David Letterman. Months later, she told the host of The Howard Stern Show that her behavior was just her way of joking around with the television host, partly in the guise of promoting her Playboy pictorial and video. She explained that what appeared to be random looks across the theater was just her looking and reacting to fans in the audience. Though the Letterman appearance spawned speculation and several jokes at her expense, she returned to the show in 1999. Several years later in February 2009, Letterman ended an incoherent and largely unresponsive interview with Joaquin Phoenix by saying, "We owe an apology to Farrah Fawcett."

That same year, Robert Duvall chose Fawcett to play the role of his wife in The Apostle, which was an independent feature film that he was producing. She received an Independent Spirit Award nomination for Best Supporting Female for the film. In 2000, she worked with director Robert Altman in the feature film Dr. T & the Women, as the wife of Richard Gere. (Her character has a mental breakdown, leading to Fawcett's first fully nude appearance.)

Around 2001, Fawcett befriended artist and designer Christopher Ciccone. Ciccone mentioned Fawcett inviting him to view her abstract paintings and sculptures in his book, Life with My Sister Madonna. In 2002, Fawcett's collaboration with sculptor Keith Edmier was exhibited at the Los Angeles County Museum of Art in a show titled Contemporary Projects 7: Keith Edmier and Farrah Fawcett 2000. The exhibit was later displayed at The Andy Warhol Museum in Pittsburgh, Pennsylvania. The sculpture was also presented in a series of photographs and a book by Rizzoli.

In November 2003, Fawcett prepared for her Broadway debut in a production of Bobbi Boland, the tragicomic tale of a former Miss Florida. However, the show never officially opened when it closed during preview performances. Fawcett was described as "vibrating with frustration" at the producer's extraordinary decision to cancel the production; just days earlier, the same producer closed an Off-Broadway show she had been backing.

Fawcett continued to work in television and appeared in the made-for-television movies and on popular television series that included Ally McBeal, four episodes of Spin City, and four episodes of The Guardian. Her work on the latter show earned her a third Emmy nomination in 2004.

Personal life

Relationships 
Fawcett began dating Lee Majors in the late 1960s. She was married to Majors from 1973 to 1982, although the couple separated in 1979. They had no children. Throughout her marriage (and despite the separation) she used the name Farrah Fawcett-Majors in her screen credits.

In 1979, Fawcett became romantically involved with actor Ryan O'Neal, and they had a son named Redmond James Fawcett O'Neal, who was born in 1985. In 1994, Fawcett told TV Guide that their relationship had some troubles. "Sometimes Ryan breaks my heart, but he's also responsible for giving me confidence in myself", she said. Fawcett ended the relationship after she caught him in bed with actress Leslie Stefanson in 1997. After their split, O'Neal's daughter Tatum O'Neal alleged that he physically abused Fawcett. "He had a terrible temper and was very violent. He beat her up", she said. Fawcett and O'Neal rekindled their relationship in 2001. On June 22, 2009, The Los Angeles Times and Reuters reported that Ryan O'Neal had said that Fawcett had agreed to marry him as soon as she felt strong enough.

From 1997 to 1998, Fawcett was in a relationship with Canadian filmmaker James Orr, who was the writer and producer of Man of the House, the Disney feature film in which she co-starred with Chevy Chase and Jonathan Taylor Thomas. The relationship ended when Orr was arrested, charged, and later convicted of beating Fawcett during a 1998 fight.

Fawcett dated Longhorn football star Greg Lott while they were undergrads at the University of Texas. Lott said they rekindled their romance in 1998 and had a "a loving, consensual, one-on-one relationship" until she died in 2009. He claimed Ryan O'Neal kept him from seeing Fawcett in her final days. "He kept me from seeing the love of my life before she died", he told ABC News. In Fawcett's living trust she left nothing for O'Neal, but she left $100,000 for Lott. Lott insisted Fawcett's relationship with O'Neal was just for show. "Everything she did with Ryan, including all of those so-called reality shows they made together, was just Hollywood fantasy, something she had to do to keep up her image", he said.

Family 
Fawcett's older sister Diane Fawcett Walls died of lung cancer just before her 63rd birthday on October 16, 2001. The fifth episode of her 2005 Chasing Farrah series followed the actress home to Texas to visit her father, James, and mother, Pauline. Pauline Fawcett died on March 4, 2005, at the age of 91.

Fawcett's only child, Redmond James Fawcett-O'Neal, was fathered by Ryan O'Neal and was born on January 30, 1985. He has struggled with drug addiction for most of his adult life. In 2008, Redmond and his father were arrested for drug possession in their Malibu home. In April 2009, Redmond was on probation for driving under the influence when he was arrested for possession of narcotics; Fawcett was in the hospital at the time. In 2014, his half-sister Tatum O'Neal told People, "I love him, but I have never seen a more scary side of addiction," and urged him to go to 12-step meetings with her, but he refused. In 2015, his probation was revoked and he was sentenced to three years in the California Department of Corrections and Rehabilitation. In 2018, he was arrested and charged with attempted murder, robbery, assault and drug possession after he allegedly tried to rob a convenience store in Santa Monica. From jail he blamed his struggles on his parents, adding that it was "not drugs that have been a problem, it's the psychological trauma of my entire life — my whole life experiences have affected me the most." Subsequently, he was found incompetent to stand trial having been diagnosed with bipolar disorder, schizophrenia, and antisocial personality disorder along with drug and alcohol abuse. His trial was put on hold and he was transferred to a state mental hospital with a maximum commitment date until October 4, 2021. If eventually convicted, he faces a possible maximum sentence of 22 years in state prison.

Cancer

Fawcett was diagnosed with anal cancer in 2006, and began treatment that included chemotherapy and surgery. Four months later, on February 2, 2007, her 60th birthday, the Associated Press reported that Fawcett was at that point cancer-free. In May 2007, Fawcett experienced a recurrence and was diagnosed with stage IV cancer that had metastasized to her liver (which has a 5-year survival rate of less than 20%); a malignant polyp was found where she had been treated for the initial cancer. Doctors contemplated whether to implant a radiation seeder (which differs from conventional radiation and is used to treat other types of cancer). Fawcett's U.S. doctors told her that she would require a colostomy.

Not wanting to proceed with a colostomy for treatment of her stage IV cancer, she traveled to Germany for treatments described variously in the press as "aggressive" and "alternative". There, Dr. Ursula Jacob prescribed a treatment including surgery to remove the anal tumor, a course of perfusion and embolization for her liver cancer by Doctors Claus Kiehling and Thomas Vogl in Germany, and chemotherapy back in Los Angeles. Although initially the tumors were regressing, their reappearance a few months later necessitated a new course, this time including laser ablation therapy and chemoembolization. Aided by friend Alana Stewart, Fawcett documented her battle with the disease.

In early April 2009, Fawcett was back in the United States and hospitalized. Media reports declared her unconscious and in critical condition, although subsequent reports indicated her condition was not so dire. On April 6, the Associated Press reported that the cancer had metastasized to her liver. This was a development that Fawcett had learned of in May 2007 and which her subsequent treatments in Germany had targeted. The report denied that she was unconscious and explained that the hospitalization was not due to her cancer, but instead due to a painful abdominal hematoma that had been the result of a minor procedure. Her spokesperson emphasized she was not "at death's door," adding "She remains in good spirits with her usual sense of humor ... She's been in great shape her whole life and has an incredible resolve and an incredible resilience." Fawcett was released from the hospital on April 9. She was accompanied by longtime companion O'Neal, and according to her doctor, was "walking and in great spirits and looking forward to celebrating Easter at home."

A month later on May 7, Fawcett was reported as being critically ill, with Ryan O'Neal quoted as saying she was spending her days at home on an IV and often asleep. The Los Angeles Times reported that she was in the last stages of terminal cancer and had the chance to see her son Redmond in April 2009, although he was shackled and under supervision, because he was then incarcerated. Her 91-year-old father, James, flew to Los Angeles to visit.

Cancer specialist Dr. Lawrence Piro was treating Fawcett in Los Angeles. He and Fawcett's friend — Angels co-star Kate Jackson, a breast cancer survivor — appeared together on The Today Show. Jackson decried such fabrications, saying they "really do hurt a human being and a person like Farrah." Piro recalled when it became necessary for Fawcett to undergo treatments that would cause her to lose her hair, acknowledging "Farrah probably has the most famous hair in the world," but also that it is not a trivial matter for any cancer patient, whose hair "affects [one's] whole sense of who [they] are." Of the documentary, Jackson averred Fawcett "didn't do this to show that 'she' is unique, she did it to show that we are all unique ... (T)his was ... meant to be a gift to others to help and inspire them."

The two-hour documentary, Farrah's Story, which was filmed by Fawcett and friend Alana Stewart, aired on NBC on May 15, 2009. At its premiere airing, the documentary was watched by nearly nine million people, and it was re-aired on the broadcast network's cable stations MSNBC, Bravo and Oxygen. On July 16, 2009, Fawcett, who had died on June 25, posthumously earned her fourth Emmy nomination as the producer of Farrah's Story. Controversy surrounded the aired version of the documentary. Her initial producing partner—who had worked with her four years earlier on her reality series, Chasing Farrah—alleged that the editing of the program by O'Neal and Stewart was not in keeping with her wishes to more thoroughly explore alternative methods of treatment of rare types of cancers such as her own.

Death

Fawcett died of anal cancer at 2:28 a.m. PDT on June 25, 2009, at the age of 62 at Saint John's Health Center in Santa Monica, California with O'Neal and Alana Stewart by her side.

A private funeral was held in Los Angeles on June 30, 2009. Farrah's son Redmond was permitted to leave his California detention center in order to attend the service, where he gave the first reading. Fawcett was interred at the Westwood Village Memorial Park in Los Angeles, next to Rodney Dangerfield.

Trust and dispute over Warhol portrait 
Fawcett did not name long-time lover Ryan O'Neal in her living trust, which she amended in 2007. She left most of her fortune, $4.5 million, to their son Redmond in a trust overseen by her business manager, Richard Francis, under its terms the principal being available only for matters relating to Redmond's health care, while he could collect the interest. She also left $500,000 to her nephew, Gregory Walls; $500,000 to her father, James Fawcett; and $100,000 to her college boyfriend Gregory Lott. Fawcett left all of her artwork to the University of Texas. When the university received her art collection, one of her Warhol portraits was missing. In 2011, after discovering that O'Neal had retained the portrait, the University of Texas filed suit. O'Neal claimed that Fawcett had given it to him. Lott maintained that Fawcett never gave up ownership of the portrait and that it was her wish to bequeath all her artwork to her alma mater. In December 2013, a Los Angeles court ruled that the portrait belonged to O'Neal.

Media coverage 
News of Fawcett's death was largely overshadowed by media coverage of the death of music icon Michael Jackson, which occurred twelve hours later on the same day. On the night of her death, ABC aired an hour-long special episode of 20/20 featuring clips from several of Barbara Walters' past interviews with Fawcett, as well as new interviews with Ryan O'Neal, Jaclyn Smith, Alana Stewart, and Dr. Lawrence Piro. Walters followed up on the story on Friday's episode of 20/20. CNN's Larry King Live planned a show exclusively about Fawcett that evening until Jackson's death caused the program to shift to cover both stories. Cher, a longtime friend of Fawcett, and Suzanne de Passe, executive producer of Fawcett's Small Sacrifices mini-series, both paid tribute to Fawcett on the program. Coincidentally, de Passe had worked for Motown Records in the 1960s and 70s, and she had also played a major part in the development of the Jackson 5 which included Michael Jackson. NBC aired a Dateline NBC special "Farrah Fawcett: The Life and Death of an Angel" the following evening, June 26, preceded by a rebroadcast of Farrah's Story in prime time.

That weekend and the following week, television tributes continued. MSNBC aired back-to-back episodes of its Headliners and Legends episodes featuring Fawcett and Jackson. TV Land aired a mini-marathon of Charlie's Angels and Chasing Farrah episodes. E! aired Michael & Farrah: Lost Icons and The Biography Channel aired Bio Remembers: Farrah Fawcett. The documentary Farrah's Story re-aired on the Oxygen Network and MSNBC. BET aired the 2004 movie The Cookout, in which Fawcett had appeared.

Larry King said of the Fawcett phenomenon:

Kate Jackson said of her former castmate:

Academy Awards' omission
In March 2010, the Academy of Motion Picture Arts and Sciences upset family and friends of Fawcett when she was excluded from the "In Memoriam" montage at the 82nd Academy Awards ceremony. The inclusion of Michael Jackson in the montage, though he was not primarily known for his film roles, only added to the controversy. Friends and colleagues of Fawcett, including Ryan and Tatum O'Neal, Jane Fonda and film critic Roger Ebert, publicly expressed their outrage at the oversight. AMPAS executive director Bruce Davis noted that Fawcett had been recognized for her "remarkable television work" at the 61st Primetime Emmy Awards in September 2009. On the exclusion, he said: "There's nothing you can say to people, particularly to family members, within a day or two of the show that helps at all. They tend to be surprised and hurt, and we understand that and we're sorry for it."

Legacy

The red one-piece bathing suit she wore in her famous 1976 poster was donated to the Smithsonian's National Museum of American History (NMAH) on February 2, 2011. Designed by CFDA Award-winning fashion designer Norma Kamali, it was donated to the Smithsonian by her executors and was formally presented to NMAH in Washington, D.C., by her longtime companion Ryan O'Neal. The iconic image of Farrah in a red swimsuit has been recreated in a limited edition Barbie doll with a gold chain and the girl-next-door locks.

In 2011, Men's Health named Fawcett in its list of the "100 Hottest Women of All-Time", ranking her at No. 31.

The song "Midnight Train to Georgia" had initially been inspired by Fawcett and Lee Majors. Songwriter James Dawn "Jim" Weatherly phoned Majors, who was one of his friends, but it was Fawcett who actually answered the call. Weatherly and Fawcett chatted briefly and she told him she was going to visit her mother and was taking "the midnight plane to Houston". Although Majors and Fawcett were both successful by that time, Weatherly used them as "characters" in his song, about a failed actress who leaves Los Angeles and is followed by her boyfriend who cannot live without her. Eventually the genders were swapped to a failed actor who leaves Los Angeles and is followed by his girlfriend who cannot live without him, a train replaced the plane, and Houston was changed to Georgia. The recording by Gladys Knight & the Pips attained the number 1 position on the Billboard chart in 1973.

In 1980, O'Neal facilitated a meeting between Fawcett and artist Andy Warhol, who created two portraits of Fawcett during their time together. Fawcett later loaned the portraits to The Andy Warhol Museum. Following a 2013 court case between O'Neal and the University of Texas, which had been named by Fawcett as the recipient of all of her artwork, one of the portraits was deemed the property of O'Neal. The portrait was valued at between $800,000 and $12 million during the court case.

Filmography

Film

Television

Plays

See also

References

External links

 
 
 
 
 
 
 Farrah Fawcett at TV Guide
 Farrah Fawcett – The Daily Telegraph obituary
 Farrah Fawcett Online Memorial

1947 births
2009 deaths
20th-century American actresses
21st-century American actresses
Actresses from Houston
Actresses from Texas
American female models
American film actresses
American people of Choctaw descent
American people of English descent
American people of French descent
American people of Irish descent
American stage actresses
American television actresses
Burials at Westwood Village Memorial Park Cemetery
Catholics from Texas
Deaths from anal cancer
Deaths from cancer in California
Female models from Texas
People from Corpus Christi, Texas
University of Texas at Austin College of Fine Arts alumni